Indian Hunter is a sculpture by Paul Manship. It depicts a Native American man using a bow and arrow at an animal.

Museum of Fine Arts, Boston
Indian Hunter is installed outside the Museum of Fine Arts, Boston, in the U.S. state of Massachusetts. The bronze was modeled in 1917 and cast in 2002.

Kenyon College
A bronze casting of the statue also exists on the campus of Kenyon College, in Ohio. The school refers to the sculpture as Indian Hunter & Antelope.

References

Animal sculptures in Massachusetts
Animal sculptures in the United States
Bronze sculptures in Massachusetts
Bronze sculptures in Ohio
Kenyon College
Sculptures of the Museum of Fine Arts, Boston
Outdoor sculptures in Boston
Sculptures of men in Massachusetts
Sculptures of men in Ohio
Sculptures of Native Americans
Statues in Boston
Statues in Ohio